The BBC Light Programme was a national radio station which broadcast chiefly mainstream light entertainment and light music from 1945 until 1967, when it was replaced by BBC Radio 2 and BBC Radio 1. It opened on 29 July 1945, taking over the long wave frequency which had earlier been used – prior to the outbreak of the Second World War on 1 September 1939 – by the National Programme.

The service was intended as a domestic replacement for the wartime General Forces Programme which had gained many civilian listeners in Britain as well as members of the British Armed Forces.

History
The long wave signal on 200 kHz/1500 metres was transmitted from Droitwich in the English Midlands (as it still is today for BBC Radio 4, although adjusted slightly to 198 kHz/1515 metres from 1 February 1988) and gave fairly good coverage of most of the United Kingdom, although a number of low-power medium wave transmitters (using 1214 kHz/247 metres) were added later to fill in local blank spots. Over the course of the 1950s and 1960s, the Light Programme (along with the BBC's two other national stations – the Home Service and the Third Programme) gradually became available on what was known at the time as VHF, as the BBC developed a network of local FM transmitters.

From its first day of broadcasting in 1945 until Monday 2 September 1957, the Light Programme would be on the air from 9.00am until midnight each day, apart from Sundays when it would come on the air at 8.00am until 11.00pm.

There was, however, a period of a year when the Light Programme was forced to end its broadcasting day one hour earlier than normal at 11.00pm. This commenced in mid-February 1947 as an effect from the appalling winter of 1946–1947 which saw a fuel shortage in the country with the government enforcing electricity saving measures, one of which was losing one hour of broadcasting per day from the Light Programme. Even after the fuel shortage had ended by spring 1947, the 11.00pm closedown each night continued as BBC Radio found itself in financial problems and needed to save money. The midnight closedown of the Light Programme resumed one year later from Sunday 11 April 1948. The long-running soap opera The Archers was first heard nationally on the Light Programme on New Year's Day 1951, although a week-long pilot version had been broadcast on the Midlands Home Service in 1950.

From Monday 2 September 1957, the Light Programme's broadcasting hours would start to increase, with a new early morning start time of 7.00am until midnight, later moving to 6.30am from Monday 29 September 1958. In 1964, broadcasting hours were increased even more, with a new morning start time of 5.30am from Monday 31 August. Up until September 1964, the Light Programme would always end its broadcasting day at midnight; however this changed on Sunday 27 September 1964, when a new closedown time of 2.00am was introduced.

The Light Programme closed down for the last time at 2.02am on Saturday 30 September 1967. At 5.30am, it was replaced by BBC Radio 2 and was also replaced by BBC Radio 1 at 7.00am.

Programming
Some programmes broadcast from the Light Programme still continue today, such as Friday Night is Music Night, Junior Choice, The Archers, Pick of the Pops, Desert Island Discs and Woman's Hour. Other programmes included:

 The Al Read Show
 Appointment with Fear
 The Archers (1951–1967)
 The Beatles Invite You to Take a Ticket to Ride (1965)
 Beyond Our Ken
 Billy Cotton Band Show
 Breakfast Special
 The Clitheroe Kid
 Dick Barton – Special Agent
 Does the Team Think?
 Desert Island Discs (1945–1946)
 Easy Beat (1960–1967)
 Educating Archie
 Family Favourites (1945–1967)
 Friday Night Is Music Night (1953–1967)
 From Us to You (1964)
 The Goon Show 
 Hancock's Half Hour
 Have a Go!
 Housewives' Choice
 Ignorance is Bliss
 I'm Sorry, I'll Read That Again
 It's That Man Again 
 Journey into Space (1953–1958)
 Junior Choice (1954–1967)
 Life with the Lyons
 Listen with Mother (1950–1964)
 Meet the Huggetts
 Movie-Go-Round
 Midday Spin
 Mrs Dale's Diary (1948–1967)
 Much Binding in the Marsh
 Music While You Work
 The Navy Lark
 Orbiter X
 Pick of the Pops (1955–1967)
 Parade of the Pops (1960–1967)
 Paul Temple
 The Public Ear
 Pop Go the Beatles (1963)
 Radio Newsreel
 Ray's a Laugh
 Richard Attenborough's Record Rendezvous
 Riders of the Range
 Round the Horne (1965–1967)
 Roundabout
 Saturday Club (1957–1967)
 Shadow of Sumuru
 The Showband Show
 Side by Side
 Sing Something Simple (1959–1967)
 The Sunday Hour (1945–1967)
 The Slide
 Sports Report
 Take It from Here
 Teenager's Turn – Here We Go
 Top Gear (1964–1967; a music show unrelated to the car franchise)
 Variety Bandbox
 Waterlogged Spa
 Welsh Rarebit
 Woman's Hour (1946–1967)
 Workers' Playtime 
 Your Hundred Best Tunes

Presenters

 Barry Alldis
 Marjorie Anderson
 Richard Attenborough
 Tony Blackburn
 Tim Brinton
 Michael Brooke
 Desmond Carrington
 Sam Costa
 Bill Crozier
 Alan Dell
 Robert Dougall
 David Dunhill
 John Dunn
 Don Durbridge
 Simon Dee
 Franklin Engelmann
 Peter Fettes
 Alan Freeman
 Keith Fordyce
 Tim Gudgin
 Peter Haigh
 Colin Hamilton
 David Hamilton
 Paul Hollingdale
 David Jacobs
 Brian Matthew
 Jean Metcalfe
 Sandy MacPherson
 Roger Moffat
 Ray Moore
 Pete Murray
 Annie Nightingale
 Ray Orchard
 Robin Richmond
 Phillip Slessor
 Douglas Smith
 Ken Sykora
 David Symonds
 John Webster
 Roy Williams
 Bruce Wyndham
 Terry Wogan
 Jimmy Young

References

External links
 Radio Rewind – The 1500m Light Programme

BBC Light Programme
BBC Radio 2
BBC Radio 1
Defunct BBC national radio stations
Radio stations established in 1945
Radio stations disestablished in 1967
1945 establishments in the United Kingdom
1967 disestablishments in the United Kingdom
1940s in the United Kingdom
1950s in the United Kingdom
1960s in the United Kingdom